Bagrada is a genus of stink bugs in the family Pentatomidae.

Species
 Bagrada abeillei Puton, 1881
 Bagrada elegans Puton, 1873
 Bagrada funerea Horvath, 1901
 Bagrada hilaris (Burmeister, 1835) (Bagrada bug)
 Bagrada qinlingensis Zheng, 1982
 Bagrada stolida (Herrich-Schaeffer, 1839)
 Bagrada turcica Horvath, 1936

References

Further reading

 
 

Pentatomidae genera
Strachiini